The Infiniti Q30 is a subcompact executive car built and sold by Nissan's Infiniti luxury brand between 2016 and 2019. The Q30 is built on the third-generation Mercedes-Benz A-Class platform to create a small, premium hatchback. The Q30 is a result of the Nissan, Renault and Mercedes partnership agreement to share technology. It ceased production in the UK in mid-2019 as the brand withdrew from Europe altogether at the same time. A modified version was also marketed under the name QX30, which offers higher ground clearance and crossover design attributes in order to be marketed as a crossover.



Q30 Concept (2013) 

The concept car was unveiled in September 2013, at the Frankfurt Motor Show.

Production model (2015) 
The production version of Q30 is based on the Q30 Concept, built on the third-generation A-Class's platform.

The vehicle was unveiled at the 2015 Frankfurt Motor Show.

The vehicles went on sale in 2015.

Engines 
The Q30 is offered with a choice of petrol and diesel engines shared with the third-generation A-Class.

Transmissions

Exterior 
The Q30 Sport has a lower ride height (1475mm), 19 inch alloy wheels and different front and rear bumpers.

Interior 

The Q30 shares much of its switch gear with the third-generation A-Class on which its based, however the cabin design differs in layout and materials. Additionally, the Q30 uses Infiniti's own infotainment system, Infiniti InTouch.

Upholstery choices include ‘City Black’ with purple stitching; ‘Cafe Teak’ brown and black upholstery with black stitching; ‘Gallery White’ white leather with red accents or Alcantara. 'Dinamica', an Italian suede like material, has been applied to the roof line and pillars.

Production 
The expansion of Nissan Motor Manufacturing UK to prepare for Q30 production was originally announced on 14 October 2013.

Production of the Q30 began at the Nissan Motor Manufacturing assembly plant in Sunderland, England in December 2015, which supplies vehicles to Europe, the United States and China.

Deliveries of the Q30 began on 20 January 2016. Production ceased in 2019 as Infiniti withdrew from the UK and European markets.

Marketing 
As part of Q30 launch in the United Kingdom, a Q30 with 48,000 copper tacks adhered to half of the vehicle's bodywork was unveiled in 2016 London Art Fair at the Islington Business Centre. The sculpture was produced by British contemporary artist Rachel Ducker.

References

External links 

Cars introduced in 2015
Q30
Hatchbacks
Compact cars
Front-wheel-drive vehicles
All-wheel-drive vehicles